Hipolito Asis Gargatagli (born August 17, 1986 in Barcelona) is a Spanish chess player. He was FIDE Master at the age of 18 in the 2004. He got International Master title in 2006. In 2018, he was the Catalan Champion. FIDE awarded him Grandmaster title in the year 2019.

Notable Games

References 

1986 births
Living people
Spanish chess players
21st-century chess players
People from Barcelona
Chess grandmasters